Yesyears is a 1991 video retrospective of the progressive rock group Yes covering the band's entire history from their formation in 1968 through their 1991 album Union and its subsequent tour. The video features interviews with the entire band, which, at the time of filming, featured eight members (Jon Anderson, Bill Bruford, Steve Howe, Tony Kaye, Trevor Rabin, Chris Squire, Rick Wakeman, and Alan White).

It was released in conjunction with a four album box set also entitled Yesyears featuring songs spanning the band's career until 1991. This rockumentary mixes new interviews with archive clips from live concert footage, recording session footage, television appearances and music videos, as well as a behind the scenes look at the then-ongoing 1991-1992 Union tour. The video was originally released on VHS, and reissued on DVD in 2003.

References

Yes (band) video albums
Documentary films about rock music and musicians
1991 video albums